The Min River (Foochow Romanized: Mìng-gĕ̤ng; Pe̍h-ōe-jī: Bân-kang; Kienning Colloquial Romanized: Ma̿ing-gó̤ng) is a -long river in Fujian province, People's Republic of China. It is the largest river in Fujian, and an important water transport channel. Most of northern and central Fujian is within its drainage area.

The provincial capital, Fuzhou, sits on the lower Min River, with its historic center being on the northern side of the river, even closer to its fall into the East China Sea; the location historically made it an important port.

Alternate sources
The traditional source of the Min River is in the far northwest of the basin, hence in China the highest reach is called the Beixi Brook. The total length of the river using this source is 505 km. But in fact, the Beixi is neither the geographic or hydrological source of the river. The Shuiqian is the furthest geographic source, and the Shuiqian-Shaxi-Min is 580 km long. A different river, the Jinxi, is larger than the Beixi-Futun at the point where the two meet, and consequently is connected to the hydrological source.

See also

List of rivers in China
Min River (disambiguation) - for other rivers with the same name

References

1.  Fujian Local Records Compilation Committee. (2001). Fujian Provincial Chronicles:  Topography. Fuzhou: Local Records Press

Rivers of Fujian